SJE may refer to:

 San Jose Earthquakes, a soccer team
 Shorter Jewish Encyclopedia
 South Jersey Energy, USA
 State Judicial Exam, China

See also 
 Sje, a Cyrillic letter
 Komi Sje, a Cyrillic letter